"Seven Days in the Sun" is a song by Welsh rock band Feeder, released as the second single from their Echo Park album. It was released on 2 April 2001 and reached number 14 on the UK Singles Chart the same month. CD1 of the single features "Just a Day", which was later released as a single.

Music video

The music video for the song features band members Grant Nicholas, Taka Hirose, and the late Jon Lee on a beach shot in Cape Town, South Africa, implementing various methods of reeling in some girls. Grant dresses up as a bike salesman, and gets the girls' passports in exchange for bicycles, Taka, a waiter in order to "demonstrate" his cooking skills, and Jon, in drag, possibly to show them his feminine side. However, it is only Taka that succeeds to impress. Nine years since the video was shot, Feeder released via their Facebook page previously unreleased behind-the-scenes footage.

The Taka’s bass guitar from the video was later put on display at the Cardiff branch of the Hard Rock Cafe, until its closure in 2010.

Track listings

UK CD1 and cassette single
 "Seven Days in the Sun" (radio edit) – 3:31
 "Just a Day" – 4:03
 "Home for Summer" – 3:25

UK CD2
 "Seven Days in the Sun" (album version) – 3:39
 "Reminders" – 3:04
 "Forever Glow" – 2:22
 "Seven Days in the Sun" (video)

UK 7-inch blue vinyl
A. "Seven Days in the Sun" – 3:39
B. "Just a Day" – 4:03

Japanese CD single
 "Seven Days in the Sun" (radio edit) – 3:31
 "Satellite News" – 4:26
 "Home for Summer" – 3:25
 "Reminders" – 3:04
 "Forever Glow" – 2:22
 "We the Electronic" – 4:00
 "W.I.T." – 2:31
 "High" (acoustic) – 3:49
 "Dry" (acoustic) – 3:49

Charts

In popular culture
In 2001, the track appeared on the PAL-version soundtrack to the racing game Gran Turismo 3: A-Spec alongside two other Feeder songs: "Buck Rogers" and "Just a Day".

References

Feeder songs
2001 singles
2001 songs
The Echo Label singles
Song recordings produced by Gil Norton
Songs written by Grant Nicholas
Songs written by Jon Lee (drummer)
Songs written by Taka Hirose